Gaviotín Rock is a rock lying in Larsen Channel, about  north of the coastal ice cliffs of Joinville Island, Antarctica, and  north of Saxum Nunatak. The name Gaviotín (gull) appears on an Argentine government chart of 1957.

References

Rock formations of the Joinville Island group